Wu Zewei (born 24 March 2000), known in Spain as Iván, is a Chinese footballer.

Club career
Having trained in Spain with a number of professional clubs, Wu returned to China and played 11 games in 2020 for Jiangsu Yancheng Dingli.

Career statistics

Club
.

References

2000 births
Living people
Sportspeople from Shenzhen
Chinese footballers
China youth international footballers
Association football midfielders
Tercera División players
China League Two players
Valencia CF players
Villarreal CF players
Atlético Madrid footballers
AD Alcorcón footballers
Flat Earth FC players
Chinese expatriate sportspeople in Spain
Expatriate footballers in Spain